The men's high jump event at the 2014 Asian Games was held at the Incheon Asiad Main Stadium, Incheon, South Korea on 29 September.

Schedule
All times are Korea Standard Time (UTC+09:00)

Records

Results
Legend
NM — No mark

References

Results

High jump men
2014 men